Radachów  is a village in the administrative district of Gmina Ośno Lubuskie, within Słubice County, Lubusz Voivodeship, in western Poland.

The village has a population of 500.

The current sołtys of Radachów is Wiesław Kinowski (elected 2021).

Notable residents 
 Anna Pappritz (1861–1939), German writer and suffragist

References

Villages in Słubice County